A boat tour is a short trip in a relatively small boat taken for touristic reasons, typically starting and ending in the same place, and normally of a duration less than a day. This contrasts with river cruising, yacht cruising, and ocean cruising, in larger boats or cruise ships, for any number of days, with accommodation in cabins.

For boat tours, usually a sightseeing boat is used, but sometimes adapted amphibious vehicles or purpose-built amphibious buses. Boat tours are often on rivers and lakes, but can be on canals as well. Sustainability is an increasing issue, since there can be an impact on the environment.

Examples
Example boat tours include:
 
Bateaux Mouches on the River Seine in Paris, France
Chao Phraya Express Boat on the Chao Phraya River in Thailand
Jaws theme park boat tour, Florida, USA
Maid of the Mist at the Niagara Falls, Canada/United States

See also
Cruising (maritime)
Ethan Allen boating accident
River cruise
Tour boat

References

External link
 

Tourist activities
Boating